Manapad is a coastal village in south India,  from Tuticorin and  south of Tiruchendur.

St. Francis Xavier came to Manapad in 1542, conducting missionary activity on the Fishery coast. He lived in a grotto cavern on the seaward face of a cliff and held mass at a chapel of the Captain's Cross, built from a ship's mast after a storm in 1540. Holy Cross Church, built close to the sea in 1581, has a relic fragment believed to be from the True Cross of Jerusalem. From 1 to 14 September, every year, the cross is publicly displayed to thousands who attend the festival season.

Valliamman cave is located nearby.

History

Traditional stories say that in 1540, a Portuguese trading vessel, while sailing around the Cape of Good Hope on its way to the East, encountered a violent storm splitting its sails and snapping the hind mast, leaving it at risk of foundering. The captain, who was devoted to the veneration of the Holy Cross, implored and entrusted the safety of the vessel and that of the crew to Christ. He made a vow that he would construct a cross from a portion of the splintered mast and have it planted on the shore where they alighted in safety. By chance, the vessel, after having drifted for several days, sought haven at the port of Kulasekharapatnam.

Culture

Festivals 
The festival of the Exaltation of the Holy Cross is celebrated annually by the Catholic Church on 14 September. It is a Portuguese tradition to lay the cross in the places where they live. This festival has been celebrated for generations over centuries.

Cinema 
The movie Neethaane En Ponvasantham had a climax shootout there and the coverage exposed the place to many Tamil people. 

A major part of Maniratnam's Kadal movie was shot in Manapad.

Singam II has some parts pictured at this church premises. Many short films were shot there.

A major part of Seenu Ramaswamy's Neerparavi was shot in Manapad.

A major part of SP Jananathan's Iyarakai movie was shot in Manapad.

Notable people

S. M. Diaz IPS
Donatus Victoria

References

Thoothukudi
Villages in Thoothukudi district